Claudio Ermelli (24 July 1892 – 29 October 1964) was an Italian film actor. He appeared in more than one hundred films from 1915 to 1962.

Filmography

References

External links
 

1892 births
1964 deaths
Actors from Turin
Italian male film actors
20th-century Italian male actors